Corinne Schroeder (born August 19, 1999) is a Canadian ice hockey goaltender, currently playing in the Premier Hockey Federation (PHF) with the Boston Pride.

Playing career 
In the 2013–14 season, Schroeder played with the Pembina Valley Hawks 19U AAA of the Manitoba Female Midget Hockey League (MFMHL) and Tier 1 Elite Hockey League (T1EHL). In grade 11, she began attending Balmoral Hall School in Winnipeg, where she joined the BH Blazers varsity prep hockey team competing in the Junior Women's Hockey League (JWHL). At Balmoral Hall, Schroeder played alongside future ZhHL champion Ryleigh Houston, future SDHL players Morgan Wabick and Taylor Wabick, and future PHFer Kaity Howarth.

NCAA 
Schroeder backstopped the Boston University Terriers women's ice hockey program in the Hockey East (HEA) conference of the NCAA Division I during the 2017–18 season to the 2020–21 season. She made marked improvement over each of her first three seasons, increasing her save percentage (SV%) and reducing her goals against average (GAA) from a respectable .913 SV% and 2.51 GAA as a freshman to an excellent .933 SV% and 1.90 GAA as a sophomore to a program record-setting .954 SV% and 1.54 GAA as a junior. Her senior campaign was cut short by the COVID-19 pandemic and she played just eight games in the heavily altered season, recording the poorest save percentage of her Terriers career with .911 and a good but unremarkable 2.23 GAA. Despite the challenges of the COVID-19 impacted season, Schroeder finished her four seasons with the best career save percentage and goals against average in Boston University Terriers women's ice hockey program history, a .929 SV% and 1.98 GAA across 91 games.

Presented with the opportunity to play a fifth year of NCAA college eligibility due to the COVID-19 pandemic, Schroeder selected to join the Quinnipiac Bobcats women's ice hockey program in the ECAC Hockey conference as a graduate student for the 2021–22 season. Her first start with the Bobcats came on September 25, 2021, a 5–1 victory against the Maine Blackbears. During the game, Schroeder made women's college ice hockey history as the first goaltender credited with a goal after the puck was misplayed by Maine into their own goal following a kick save by Schroeder. The history-making debut set the tone for her season, during which she recorded six shutouts and finished with the third-best save percentage and sixth-best goals against average in the country; her .951 SV% set a single-season program record. Her incredible season earned top-three finalist selection for 2022 Women's Hockey Goalie of the Year and she was named to the New England Division I All-Star Team and All-USCHO First Team.

Schroeder concluded her college ice hockey career playing in the 2022 NCAA women's ice hockey tournament, her first NCAA tournament. She earned a shutout in the first round against the Syracuse Orange in a 0–4 victory, the first NCAA tournament win and first shutout in Quinnipiac Bobcats program history. Facing the number one seeded Ohio State Buckeyes in the national quarterfinals, she made 73 saves in a Herculean effort that carried the Bobcats into double overtime before they ultimately fell to the Buckeyes. Prior to the national quarterfinals, her career high stops in a single game  had been 42 saves. The 73-save game set a Quinnipiac Bobcats women's ice hockey program single-game record and ties for sixth in the NCAA Division I women's ice hockey all-time record book.

PHF 
During her graduate season at Quinnipiac, Schroeder began exploring options that would allow her to pursue a professional ice hockey career in North America and reached out to both the Premier Hockey Federation (PHF) and the Professional Women's Hockey Players Association (PWHPA). In August 2022, the Boston Pride officially announced they had signed Schroeder for the 2022–23 PHF season – though the signing had been inadvertently leaked in late July via the rosters published by Hockey Canada for the Canadian national team selection camps for the 2022 IIHF Women's World Championship. Schroeder highlighted the season length, which would provide needed game experience, as a significant part of her decision to sign in the PHF. Regarding the opportunity to play at the professional level, Schroeder explained, "I would say this is what I've been working for my whole life... It's honestly a dream and one that I never really knew I could have growing up but now it's a reality."

Taking a page from her phenomenal season with Quinnipiac, Schroeder started her rookie PHF season with a bang, recording three consecutive shutouts over the first three games of the season and setting a league record for consecutive shutouts. Her shutout streak lasted a total of 183 minutes and 15 seconds and was recorded across two home games and one road game and against three different teams (Connecticut Whale, Metropolitan Riveters, Minnesota Whitecaps). On December 11, 2022, Schroeder stopped all 25 shots to set a new PHF single season record with her fourth shutout in just seven starts for the first place Pride.

Hockey Canada 
As a member of the Canadian national under-18 team, Schroeder won a silver medal at the 2017 IIHF U18 Women's World Championship. She did not see any ice time during the tournament, serving as third netminter behind starters Danika Ranger and Édith D'Astous-Moreau.

Schroeder was invited to the Hockey Canada National Women’s Development Team Summer Camps in 2020, 2021, and 2022, and has also participated in a number of other national women’s development team events, first in 2018.

Personal life 
Schroeder was born and raised in Elm Creek, a local urban district in the Pembina Valley Region of Manitoba, Canada. She has four siblings: three sisters and one brother. Her younger sister, Megan, also played ice hockey as a goaltender at Balmoral Hall before retiring from elite-level play in 2019 to focus on her post-secondary education.

Schroeder completed dual bachelor’s degrees with honors at Boston University, earning both a BSc in health science from the College of Health and Rehabilitation Sciences (Sargent College) and a BA in psychology. She holds a MBA from Quinnipiac University and has expressed interest in starting a physical-therapy practice after her playing career has ended.

Career statistics

Regular season and playoffs 

Sources:

Awards and honors

Weekly awards 
Premier Hockey Federation Three Stars of the Week

 First Star – Week of November 5, 2022
 Second Star – Week of November 22, 2022

Hockey East Defensive Player of the Week

 Week of November 20, 2017
 Week of November 19, 2018
 Week of January 7, 2019
 Week of January 14, 2019
 Week of February 18, 2019
 Week of October 21, 2019
 Week of December 9, 2019

Records

Boston University 
Boston University Terriers women's ice hockey program records, valid through .

 Best career save percentage (minimum 40 games played), .929 SV%
 Best career goals against average, 1.98 GAA
 Best single-season save percentage, .943 SV% (2019–20)
 Best single-season goals against average, 1.54 GAA (2019–20)

Quinnipiac University 
Quinnipiac Bobcats women's ice hockey program records, valid through .

 Best single-season save percentage, .951 SV%
 Most saves in a single game, 73 saves (vs. Ohio State – March 12, 2022)

NCAA Division I
NCAA Division I Women's Ice Hockey all-time records, valid through .
 18th best career save percentage (minimum 1000 saves), .934 SV% (2017–2022)
 13th best single-season save percentage (minimum 100 saves, played ≥33% of team's minutes), .951 SV% (2021–22)
 6th most saves in a single game, 73 saves (Quinnipiac vs. Ohio State – March 12, 2022)

References

External links 
 

1999 births
Living people
Balmoral Hall School alumni
Boston Pride players
Boston University Terriers women's ice hockey players
Canadian expatriate ice hockey players in the United States
Canadian women's ice hockey goaltenders
Ice hockey people from Manitoba
People from Pembina Valley Region, Manitoba
Quinnipiac Bobcats women's ice hockey players